Aditya Pancholi is an Indian film actor and producer who appears in Bollywood films. He started his career as a lead actor but found more success with supporting and negative roles and received a Filmfare nomination for the Best Performance in a Negative Role for Yes Boss (1997).

Pancholi began his career with television movies produced by Nari Hira which have all become successful and ventured into mainstream Bollywood cinema with Sasti Dulhan Mehnga Dulha (1986). Pancholi first came to limelight with a supporting role in Maha-Sangram (1990). He initially gave critically acclaimed performances as a lead actor with films like Kab Tak Chup Rahungi (1988), Qatil (1988), Sailaab (1990), Laal Paree (1991), Naamcheen (1991) and  Yaad Rakhegi Duniya (1992), but failed to find commercial success. His biggest commercial success as a lead actor and his most well-known performance was in Mahesh Bhatt's Saathi (1991).

Pancholi was cast in multi-starrer movies like Ladaai (1989), Jaadugar (1989), Aatish: Feel the Fire (1994) and Aankhen (2002) and became synonymous for negative roles with movies like Awwal Number (1990), Jung (1996), Yes Boss (1997), Hameshaa (1997), Jung (2000) and Musafir (2004).

Filmography

Television films and series

Feature film

References

External links

Indian filmographies
Male actor filmographies